The Progressive Party was a political party aligned to the Liberal Party that contested municipal elections in the United Kingdom.

History

It was founded in 1888 by a group of Liberals and leaders of the labour movement. It was also supported by the Fabian Society, and Sidney Webb was one of its councillors. In the first elections of the London County Council (LCC) in January 1889 the Progressive Party won 70 of the 118 seats. It lost power in 1907 to the Municipal Reform Party (a Conservative organisation) under Richard Robinson.

Leaders
1889: Thomas Farrer
1890: James Stuart
1892: Charles Harrison
1898: Thomas McKinnon Wood
1908: John Benn
1918: John Scott Lidgett

Members

London Reform Union
In 1892 the London Reform Union was formed as the propaganda arm of the party.

See also
 :Category:Progressive Party (London) politicians

References

Defunct political parties in England
Politics of London
Political parties established in 1888
History of local government in London (1889–1965)
1888 establishments in England
Liberal Party (UK)